The Baroque Cycle is a series of novels by American writer Neal Stephenson. It was published in three volumes containing eight books in 2003 and 2004. The story follows the adventures of a sizable cast of characters living amidst some of the central events of the late 17th and early 18th centuries in Europe, Africa, Asia, and Central America.  Despite featuring a literary treatment consistent with historical fiction, Stephenson has characterized the work as science fiction, because of the presence of some anomalous occurrences and the work's particular emphasis on themes relating to science and technology. The sciences of cryptology and numismatics feature heavily in the series, as they do in some of Stephenson's other works.

Books
The Baroque Cycle consists of several novels "lumped together into three volumes because it is more convenient from a publishing standpoint"; Stephenson felt calling the works a trilogy would be "bogus".

Appearing in print in 2003 and 2004, the cycle contains eight books originally published in three volumes:

 Quicksilver, Vol. I of the Baroque Cycle – Arthur C. Clarke Award winner, Locus Award nominee, 2004
 Book 1 – Quicksilver
 Book 2 – King of the Vagabonds
 Book 3 – Odalisque
 The Confusion, Vol. II of the Baroque Cycle – Locus Award winner
 Book 4 – Bonanza
 Book 5 – The Juncto
 The System of the World, Vol. III of the Baroque Cycle – Locus Award winner, Arthur C. Clarke Award nominee, 2005
 Book 6 – Solomon's Gold
 Book 7 – Currency
 Book 8 – The System of the World

Setting
The books travel throughout early modern Europe between the Restoration of the Stuart monarchy and the beginning of the 18th century. Though most of the focus is in Europe, the adventures of one character, Jack Shaftoe, do take him throughout the world, and the fledgling British colonies in North America are important to another (Daniel Waterhouse). Quicksilver takes place mainly in the years between the Restoration of the Stuart monarchy in England (1660) and the Glorious Revolution of 1688. The Confusion follows Quicksilver without temporal interruption, but ranges geographically from Europe and the Mediterranean through India to the Philippines, Japan and Mexico. The System of the World takes place principally in London in 1714, about ten years after the events of The Confusion.

Themes
A central theme in the series is Europe's transformation away from feudal rule and control toward the rational, scientific, and more merit-based systems of government, finance, and social development that define what is now considered "western" and "modern".
 
Characters include Sir Isaac Newton, Gottfried Leibniz, Nicolas Fatio de Duillier, William of Orange, Louis XIV of France, Oliver Cromwell, Peter the Great, John Churchill, 1st Duke of Marlborough and many other people of note of that time. The fictional characters of Eliza, Jack and Daniel collectively cause real historic effects.

The books feature considerable sections concerning alchemy. The principal alchemist of the tale is the mysterious Enoch Root, who, along with the descendants of several characters in this series, is also featured in the Stephenson novels Cryptonomicon and Fall.

Inspiration
Stephenson was inspired to write The Baroque Cycle when, while working on Cryptonomicon, he encountered a statement by George Dyson in Darwin among the Machines that suggests Leibniz was "arguably the founder of symbolic logic and he worked with computing machines". He also had heard considerable discussion of the Leibniz–Newton calculus controversy and Newton's work at the treasury during the last 30 years of his life, and in particular the case against Leibniz as summed up in the Commercium Epistolicum of 1712 was a huge inspiration which went on to inform the project. He found "this information striking when [he] was already working on a book about money and a book about computers". Further research into the period excited Stephenson and he embarked on writing the historical piece that became The Baroque Cycle.

Characters

Main characters
Daniel Waterhouse, an English natural philosopher and Dissenter
Jack Shaftoe, an illiterate adventurer of great resourcefulness and charisma
Eliza, a girl abducted into slavery, and later freed, who becomes a spy and a financier
Enoch Root, a mysterious and ageless man who also appears in Cryptonomicon, set in World War II and the 1990s. He also appears in Fall; or, Dodge in Hell.
Bob Shaftoe, a soldier in the service of John Churchill, and brother of Jack Shaftoe

Minor characters

Louis Anglesey, Earl of Upnor, best swordsman in England
Thomas More Anglesey, Cavalier, Duke of Gunfleet
Duc d'Arcachon, French admiral who dabbles in slavery
Etienne d'Arcachon, son of the duke; most polite man in France
Henri Arlanc, Huguenot, friend of Jack Shaftoe.
Henry Arlanc, Son of Henri Arlanc, porter of the Royal Society
Mrs. Arlanc, wife of Henry
Gomer Bolstrood, dissident agitator, future legendary furniture maker
Clarke, English alchemist, boards young Isaac Newton
Charles Comstock, son of John Comstock
John Comstock, Earl of Epsom and Lord Chancellor
Roger Comstock, Marquis of Ravenscar, Whig Patron of Daniel Waterhouse
Will Comstock, Earl of Lostwithiel
Moseh de la Cruz, galley slave, Spanish Jew
Dappa, Nigerian linguist aboard Minerva
Vrej Esphanian, galley slave, Armenian Trader
Mr. Foot, galley slave, erstwhile bar-owner from Dunkirk
Édouard de Gex, Jesuit fanatic, court priest at Versailles
Gabriel Goto, galley slave, Jesuit priest from Japan
Lothar von Hacklheber, German banker obsessed with alchemy
Thomas Ham, of Ham Bros Goldsmiths, half-brother-in-law of Daniel Waterhouse
Otto van Hoek, galley slave, Captain of the Minerva

Jeronimo, galley slave, a high-born Spaniard with Tourette's syndrome
Mr. Kikin, Russian diplomat in London
Nyazi, galley slave, camel-trader of the Upper Nile
Norman Orney, London shipbuilder and Dissenter
Danny Shaftoe, son of Jack Shaftoe
Jimmy Shaftoe, son of Jack Shaftoe
Mr. Sluys, Dutch merchant and traitor
Mr. Threader, Tory money-scrivener
Drake Waterhouse, Puritan father of Daniel Waterhouse
Faith Waterhouse, wife of Daniel Waterhouse
Godfrey Waterhouse, son of Daniel Waterhouse
Mayflower Waterhouse, half-sister of Daniel Waterhouse, wife of Thomas Ham
Raleigh Waterhouse, half-brother of Daniel Waterhouse
Sterling Waterhouse, half-brother of Daniel Waterhouse
Charles White, Tory, Captain of the King's Messengers, who has the habit of biting off people's ears
Yevgeny the Raskolnik, Russian heretic, whaler and anti-tsarist rebel
Peter Hoxton (Saturn), horologist
Colonel Barnes, peg-legged commander of dragoons
Queen Kottakkal, sovereign of the Malabar pirates
Teague Partry, distant relative of the Shaftoes in Connaught, Ireland

Historical figures who appear as characters

Jean Bart
Catherine Barton
Henry St John, 1st Viscount Bolingbroke
Robert Boyle
Henrietta Braithwaite, mistress of George II
Caroline of Ansbach
Charles II of England
John Churchill, later 1st Duke of Marlborough
Sir William Curtius, Baron Curtius of Sweden
D'Artagnan
Nicolas Fatio de Duillier
John Flamsteed
Benjamin Franklin (as a young boy)
Eleanor Erdmuthe Louise, widow of John Frederick
Elizabeth Charlotte of the Palatine
George I of Great Britain
George II of Great Britain, the Prince of Wales
Nell Gwyn
George Frideric Handel
Robert Hooke
Christiaan Huygens
James Stuart, Duke of York, then James VII and II
George Jeffreys
Johann Georg IV, Elector of Saxony

Arnold Joost van Keppel
Jack Ketch
Gottfried Leibniz
Louis XIV of France
Mary II of England
Thomas Newcomen
Isaac Newton
Henry Oldenburg
William Penn
Samuel Pepys
Peter the Great traveling incognito as Peter Romanov
Bonaventure Rossignol, a French cryptanalyst
James Scott, Duke of Monmouth
John III Sobieski, King of Poland
Sophia of Hanover
Sophia Charlotte of Hanover
Edward "Blackbeard" Teach
Elizabeth Villiers
John Wilkins
William III of England, Prince of Orange
Christopher Wren
John Locke
Mary Goose
John Keill

Critical response
Robert Wiersem of The Toronto Star called The Baroque Cycle a "sublime, immersive, brain-throttlingly complex marvel of a novel that will keep scholars and critics occupied for the next 100 years".

References

External links
Locus Magazine interview with Neal Stephenson
The Source of the Modern World interview by Glenn Reynolds at Tech Central Station
Back to the Baroque review by Reynolds in The Weekly Standard
"Neal Stephenson – the interview" on Guardian Unlimited, regarding The Baroque Cycle

 
Historical novels by series
Novels by Neal Stephenson
Picaresque novels
Cultural depictions of Benjamin Franklin
Cultural depictions of Blackbeard
Cultural depictions of Isaac Newton